= Majeed Hayat =

Fellow of the Institute of Electrical and Electronics Engineers

Majeed Hayat from the University of New Mexico, Albuquerque, NM was named Fellow of the Institute of Electrical and Electronics Engineers (IEEE) in 2014 for contributions to the modeling of impact ionization and noise in avalanche-photodiode devices.
